Francis Stanley may refer to:
 Francis Edgar Stanley, American businessman
 Francis Drummond Greville Stanley, architect in Queensland, Australia